Deng Mengrong (鄧猛榮; born 5 March 1990) is a Chinese weighlifter. She competed at the 2013 World Championships in the Women's 63 kg, winning the Bronze medal.  She won Gold in the 2014 World Weightlifting Championships in Almaty.

References

External links 
 

1990 births
Living people
Chinese female weightlifters
World Weightlifting Championships medalists
20th-century Chinese women
21st-century Chinese women